This is the electoral history of Ned Lamont, the 89th and current Governor of Connecticut.
He previously ran for governor in 2010, and was the Democratic candidate for the United States Senate in 2006.

Connecticut State Senate election

1990

U.S. Senate election

2006

Connecticut gubernatorial elections

2010

2018

2022

Notes

References

Lamont, Ned
Ned Lamont